The Witches' Cave (in Spanish, Caverna de las Brujas) is a cave, a nature reserve and a national natural monument in Argentina.

It is a solutional limestone cave, formed by Jurassic sedimentary rock that rose from the ocean as the Andes emerged during the Cenozoic Era. The rock was eroded by underground water currents and vertically fractured. Further erosion occurred at the end of the last Ice Age, when precipitation was much higher than today.

The Witches' Cave is home to many peculiar speleothems (such as stalactites and stalagmites), deep underground water galleries, and large vaulted spaces called Sala de la Virgen (Virgin Room) and Las Flores (The Flowers). It hosts a particular fauna adapted to live without solar radiation (spiders and springtails). The galleries closest to the entrance are occasional shelters for bats and mice.

About  of the cave's passages have been explored. The site is one of the major tourist attractions in southern Mendoza, but visitors are only granted access (with a guide and proper equipment) to the first  of galleries, which are already damaged.

External links

 Witches' Cave at the Protected Areas Federal System of Argentina.
 Caverna de las Brujas description and video
 Caverna de las Brujas - Underground World
Photo Gallery

Caves of Argentina
Limestone caves
Wild caves
Nature reserves in Argentina
Landforms of Mendoza Province
Protected areas of Mendoza Province